The 1969 Dutch Open was a combined men's and women's tennis tournament staged in Hilversum, Netherlands. The tournament was played on outdoor clay courts and was held from 28 July to 3 August 1969. It was the 13th edition of the tournament and the second in the Open era of tennis. Tom Okker and Kerry Melville won the singles titles.

Finals

Men's singles
 Tom Okker defeated  Roger Taylor 10–8, 7–9, 6–4, 6–4

Women's singles
 Kerry Melville defeated  Karen Krantzcke 6–2, 3–6, 6–3

Men's doubles
 Tom Okker /  Roger Taylor defeated  Jan Kodeš /  Jan Kukal 6–3, 6–2, 6–4

Women's doubles
 Kerry Melville /  Karen Krantzcke defeated  Pat Walkden /  Helen Gourlay 1–6, 6–4, 6–3

Mixed doubles
Final not played due to thunderstorms.

References

External links
ITF – Hilversum tournament details

Dutch Open (tennis)
Dutch Open
Dutch Open
Dutch Open
Dutch Open (tennis), 1969